Rensis Likert (August5, 1903September3, 1981) was an American organizational and social psychologist known for developing the Likert scale, a psychometrically sound scale based on responses to multiple questions. The scale has become a method to measure people's thoughts and feelings from opinion surveys to personality tests. Likert also founded the theory of participative management, which is used to engage employees in the workplace. Likert's contributions in psychometrics, research samples, and open-ended interviewing have helped form and shape social and organizational psychology.

In 1926, Likert earned a B.A. in Economics and Sociology from the University of Michigan; in 1932 he earned a Ph.D. in Psychology from Columbia University. He worked for the U.S. Department of Agriculture until 1946. During World War II, Likert transitioned to working for the Office of War Information (OWI).  At the OWI, he was appointed head of the United States Strategic Bombing Survey Morale Division (USSBS) in 1944.

After retiring at the age of 67, he formed Rensis Likert Associates, an institution based on his theories of management in organizational psychology. He is the author of numerous books about management, conflict, and behavioral research applications, including Human Organization: Its Management and Value and New Ways of Managing Conflict.

Personal life 

Rensis Likert was born in 1903 to George Herbert Likert and Cornelia Adrianna (Cora) Likert in Cheyenne, Wyoming. Influenced by his father, an engineer with the Union Pacific Railroad, Likert studied civil engineering at the University of Michigan in Ann Arbor for three years. He worked as an intern with the Union Pacific Railroad during the Great Railroad Strike of 1922, which sparked his interest in studying organizational behavior.

At the University of Michigan, Likert switched from studying civil engineering to economics and sociology due to the influence of professor Robert Angell. Likert received a B.A. in sociology in 1926. Upon graduation, he studied at the Union Theological Seminary for a year. He then went on to earn a Ph.D. in psychology at Columbia University in 1932. While studying at Columbia University, he approached the nascent  discipline of social psychology. In 1938, he co-authored Public Opinion and the Individual with his mentor at Columbia, Gardner Murphy.

Likert married Jane Gibson while at Columbia University, having met at the University of Michigan. They had two daughters: Elizabeth and Patricia. In 1969, Likert retired as Director of the Institute for Social Research. The couple moved to Honolulu, Hawaii, where he formed Rensis Likert Associates. Likert died at 78 years of age on September 3, 1981, in Ann Arbor, Michigan.

Career

Life Insurance Agency Management Association 
In 1935, Likert became Director of Research for the Life Insurance Agency Management Association (LIAMA) in Hartford, Connecticut. There, Likert began a research program to compare and evaluate the effectiveness of different modes of supervision.

United States Department of Agriculture 
In 1939, Likert was invited to organize the Division of Program Surveys (DPS) at the Bureau of Agriculture Statistics (BAS). Its purpose was to gather farmers' thoughts about USDA-sponsored New Deal programs and to combat the effects of the Great Depression. During World War II, as the director of the Program Surveys Division in the USDA's Bureau of Agricultural Economics (BAE), Likert ran surveys for the USDA. But as the war progressed, the division ran program surveys for multiple government agencies, including the Office of War Information, the U.S. Department of the Treasury, the Federal Reserve Board, and the U.S. Strategic Bombing Survey. In 1943, he developed the first national geographic sampling frame. During the war, Likert recruited other social psychologists into the growing government survey department.

Institute for Social Research 
After the end of the war, the Department of Agriculture was forced by Congress to stop its social survey work. Likert and his team (many of them academics on temporary wartime duty) decided to move to a university. They accepted an offer in the summer of 1946 from the University of Michigan to form the Survey Research Center (SRC). In 1949, when Dorwin Cartwright moved the Center for Group Dynamics from MIT to the University of Michigan in 1949, the SRC became the Institute for Social Research (ISR). Likert was the director of the ISR until his retirement in 1970.

Rensis Likert Associates 
Upon retirement, Likert founded Rensis Likert Associates to consult for numerous corporations. He also helped start the Institute for Corporate Productivity. During his tenure at the Institute for Corporate Productivity, Likert devoted particular attention to research on organizations. During the 1960s and 1970s, his books on management theory were closely studied in Japan and their impact can be seen across modern Japanese organizations. He completed research on major corporations around the world, and his studies have accurately predicted the subsequent performance of the corporations.

Contributions

Open-ended interviewing 
Likert contributed to the field of psychometrics by developing open-ended interviewing, a technique used to collect information about a person's thoughts, experiences, and preferences. It was common in the 1930s for researchers to use objective, closed-ended questions for the coding process to be valid. While this technique was used well in many domains, Likert saw the need for more opportunities to ask people about their attitudes towards various issues. Within open-ended interviewing, he and his colleagues invented the "funneling technique", which is a way to keep the interview open for comments, but directed in a specific way. The interview would begin with open-ended questions but gradually move into more narrowed questions. Today, open-ended interviewing is largely used in research studies where there is a need to understand people's attitudes.

Likert scale 

Likert is best known for the Likert scale. Likert created the method in 1932 as part of his Ph.D. thesis to identify the extent of a person's attitudes and feelings towards international affairs. The Likert scale is used in conducting surveys, with applications to business-related areas such as marketing or customer satisfaction, the social sciences, and attitude-related research projects.

A Likert scale consists of the sum or average of scores from responses to a group of survey questions.  These scores are transformed into a scale score through psychometric methods.

Management systems

Likert developed his management systems in the 1950s.  He outlined four systems of management to describe the relationship, involvement, and roles of managers and subordinates in industrial settings. These four management systems are:
Exploitative Authoritative
Benevolent Authoritative
Consultative System
Participative System.

Professional achievements
 1932 — Developed the Likert Scale
 1944 — Appointed head of the United States Strategic Bombing Survey Morale Division (USSBS) (1944)  
 1949 —  Fellow of the American Statistical Association
 1959 — President, American Statistical Association 
 1967 — Honorary degree from Tilburg University, Netherlands
 Developed Open-ended Interviewing 
 Developed scales for attitude measurement
 Developed the funneling technique for interviewing
 Introduced Participative management

Books
 Technique for the Measurement of Professional Attitudes (1932)
 Developing patterns in management (American Management Association, 1955)
 The Presidents Column (1959)
 New Patterns of Management (1961)
 Human Organization: Its Management and Value (1967)
 New Ways of Managing Conflict(1976, with Jane Gibson Likert)
 A Method for Coping with Conflict in Problem Solving Groups (1978)

As Co-editor:
 Public Opinion and the Individual (1938)
 Moral and Agency Management (1940-1944) 
 Some applications of Behavioral Research (1957)

References

Further reading

 Brewer, J. D. (1968). Review of The Human Organization. American Sociological Review, 33(5), 825-826
 Converse, Jean M. (1987)  Survey Research in the United States: Roots and Emergence 1890-1960 (U of California Press)
 Effrat, A. (1968). Review: Democratizing and Producing. Science, 162(3859), 1260–1261.
 Hall, J. W. (1972). A Comparison of Halpin and Croft's Organizational Climates and Likert and Likert's Organizational Systems.     Administrative Science Quarterly, 17(4), 586–590.
 Huczynski, A.A. and Buchanan, D.A. (2007). Organizational Behaviour. 6th Edition, Pearson Education.the

1903 births
1981 deaths
American statisticians
Public administration scholars
Columbia University alumni
University of Michigan College of Literature, Science, and the Arts alumni
20th-century American mathematicians
Fellows of the American Statistical Association
Presidents of the American Statistical Association
Mathematicians from Wyoming